Marsh Village is a village in Saint Paul Parish, Antigua and Barbuda.

Demographics 
Marsh Village has one enumeration district, ED 72100 MarshVillage.

Census data (2011)
Compiled from

Individual

Household 
Marsh Village has 104 households.

References 

Populated places in Antigua and Barbuda
Saint Paul Parish, Antigua and Barbuda